TAFE Queensland North was formed on 1 July 2013 by the merger of Barrier Reef Institute of TAFE and Tropical North Queensland TAFE. It services North Queensland and Far North Queensland, and is the largest TAFE region in Queensland with close to 20 campus locations in sixteen localities, covering an area of 52'000 kilometres.

In 2017 TAFE Queensland commenced consolidating TAFE Queensland North and its five other regional registered training organisations (RTOs) into a single RTO. TAFE Queensland North now no longer exists as a separate RTO.

Campus locations
Atherton
Northern Peninsula Area (Bamaga)
Bowen
Burdekin
Cairns
Cairns - Great Barrier Reef International Marine College
Charters Towers
Cloncurry
Ingham
Innisfail
Mareeba
Mount Isa
Normanton
Palm Island
Thursday Island
Townsville (Aitkenvale)
Townsville (Bohle - Trade Training Centre)
Townsville (Pimlico)
Whitsundays

See also
TAFE Queensland

References

External links
TAFE Queensland

TAFE Queensland
Education in Queensland